Žiūrai is a village in Varėna district municipality, in Alytus County, southeastern Lithuania. It is situated on Ūla River. According to the 2001 census, the village has a population of 35 people.

References

Villages in Alytus County
Varėna District Municipality